The 2004 Qatar Ladies Open (known as the 2004 Qatar Total Open for sponsorship reasons), was a women's tennis tournament played on outdoor hard courts. It was the 4th edition of the Qatar Total Open, and was part of the Tier II Series of the 2004 WTA Tour. It took place at the Khalifa International Tennis Complex in Doha, Qatar from 1 March until 7 March 2004. Third-seeded Anastasia Myskina won the singles title.

Points and prize money

Point distribution

Finals

Singles

 Anastasia Myskina defeated  Svetlana Kuznetsova, 4–6, 6–4, 6–4

Doubles

 Svetlana Kuznetsova /  Elena Likhovtseva defeated  Janette Husárová /  Conchita Martínez, 7–6(7–4), 6–2

References

Qatar Ladies Open
Qatar Ladies Open
2004 in Qatari sport
Tennis in Qatar
Sport in Doha